Abu Baham is a small village situated in the northern region of the Kingdom of Bahrain, on the western outskirts of the capital city Manama. The village lies under the Northern Governorate administrative region. The village lies directly south of Al Musalla, west of the village of Khamis and east of Sehla.

References

Populated places in the Northern Governorate, Bahrain